Adrián Káčerík (born 2 August 1997) is a Slovak footballer who plays for Dukla Banská Bystrica as a midfielder.

Club career

FK Železiarne Podbrezová
Káčerík made his professional Fortuna Liga debut for Železiarne Podbrezová against DAC Dunajská Streda on 14 May 2017, as a substitute for Matej Kochan, in the 89th minute of the match.

References

External links
 FK Železiarne Podbrezová official club profile 
 
 
 Futbalnet profile 

1997 births
Living people
Slovak footballers
Association football midfielders
FK Železiarne Podbrezová players
MFK Tatran Liptovský Mikuláš players
MFK Dukla Banská Bystrica players
2. Liga (Slovakia) players
Slovak Super Liga players
Place of birth missing (living people)